In baseball statistics, the term times on base, also abbreviated as TOB, is the cumulative total number of times a batter has reached base as a result of  hits, walks and hit by pitches. This statistic does not include times reaching first by way of error, dropped third strike, fielder's obstruction or a fielder's choice, making this statistic somewhat of a misnomer.

Pete Rose is the all-time leader, being on base 5,929 times in his career. Barry Bonds (5,599), Ty Cobb (5,532), Rickey Henderson (5,343), Carl Yastrzemski (5,304), Stan Musial (5,282), and Hank Aaron (5,205) are the only other players to be on base more than 5,000 times.

Key

List

Stats updated as of the end of the 2022 season.

Notes

References

Career Leaders & Records for Times On Base at Baseball-Reference.com

Major League Baseball statistics
On base